Gradiček is a small settlement northwest of Krka in the Municipality of Ivančna Gorica in central Slovenia. The area is part of the historical region of Lower Carniola and is now included in the Central Slovenia Statistical Region.

Geography

Poltarica Spring—the source of Poltarica Creek, a tributary of the Krka River—lies southwest of the village core. Above the spring is Poltarica Cave, which was discovered in April, 2003. A population of olms lives in the cave, and during high-water conditions there is also a subterranean waterfall in the cave.

References

External links

Gradiček on Geopedia

Populated places in the Municipality of Ivančna Gorica